Quercus subsericea is a tree species in the beech family Fagaceae. There are no known subspecies. It is placed in subgenus Cerris, section Cyclobalanopsis.

This oak species is an emergent tropical forest tree, growing up to 52 m. tall and 0.86 m. dbh and has been recorded from Malaysia, Indonesia, Philippines (Palawan).

References

External links
 
 

subsericea
Flora of Malesia
Trees of Borneo
Trees of the Philippines
Taxa named by Aimée Antoinette Camus
Flora of the Borneo montane rain forests
Flora of the Borneo lowland rain forests